Saint-Jory is a commune in the Haute-Garonne department in southwestern France.  It is served by Saint-Jory station on the Bordeaux-Toulouse line.

Population

Sights
The Château de Saint-Jory is a 16th-century castle which is listed as a historic site by the French Ministry of Culture.

See also
Communes of the Haute-Garonne department

References

Communes of Haute-Garonne